We Are the Marines is a 1942 full-length documentary film produced by The March of Time. It was produced and directed by Louis De Rochemont and distributed by 20th Century Fox.

Plot
The early portions of the film deal with the history of the Corps, from Colonial times to the 1942. The film's midsection details the arduous training procedure of the Few and the Proud at Parris Island and elsewhere. Finally, wartime newsreel footage is adroitly blended with dramatized re-enactments to illustrate the contributions, and the necessity, of the Marines in World War II.

External links

1942 films
1940s war films
American black-and-white films
Films directed by Louis de Rochemont
American World War II propaganda films
20th Century Fox films
The March of Time films
Films about the United States Marine Corps
American documentary films
1942 documentary films
American war films